Philip Campbell may refer to:
 Philip P. Campbell (1862–1941), American politician
 Philip Campbell (scientist) (born 1951), editor-in-chief of the scientific journal Nature
 Phillip Campbell, American tennis coach
 Phil Campbell (musician) (born 1961), Welsh musician

See also
 Phil Campbell (disambiguation)